Popular Alternative (AP) is a Christian-democratic political party in Italy that was founded on 18 March 2017 after the dissolution of New Centre-Right (NCD), one of the two parties that emerged at the break-up of The People of Freedom (PdL, the main Italian centre-right party from 2008 to 2013).

"Popular" is a reference to popolarismo, the Italian variety of Christian democracy. The party has been a member of the European People's Party (EPP) since its foundation, having inherited the membership of the NCD.

The party's founder was Angelino Alfano, a former protége of Silvio Berlusconi and secretary of PdL (2011–2013) who has served as Minister of Justice (Berlusconi IV Cabinet, 2008–2011), Interior (Letta and Renzi Cabinets, 2013–2016) and Foreign Affairs (Gentiloni Cabinet, 2016–2018). In December 2017 Alfano announced that he would not stand in the 2018 general election and the party suffered the split of a large centre-right faction, whose members wanted to re-align with the centre-right coalition. The rump of the party continued its alliance with the Democratic Party, by formally entering the centre-left coalition, and, with Alfano's backing, Beatrice Lorenzin, Minister of Health since 2013, became AP's de facto leader.

In 2019 what remained of the party made a right-wing turn and formed an alliance with The People of Family.

History

Origins and background
In November 2013 The People of Freedom (PdL), the centre-right party led by Silvio Berlusconi, was transformed back into Forza Italia (FI). A group of dissidents, led by Angelino Alfano, opposed the move and launched the New Centre-Right (NCD). Up to then, Alfano had been national secretary of the PdL and Berlusconi's protégé. Since its foundation, the NCD was part of the Italian governments successively led by Enrico Letta, Matteo Renzi and Paolo Gentiloni, all three members of the Democratic Party (PD), and Alfano served as Minister of the Interior and Foreign Affairs.

Foundation and early splits
On 18 March 2017 the NCD was dissolved into Popular Alternative (AP). Alfano's aim was to build a centre-right alliance with FI, while being at odds with Lega Nord (LN) and the Brothers of Italy (FdI), deemed "populist". Alfano also proposed a primary election to select the centre-right candidate for Prime Minister.

Virtually all NCD's leading members (including Maurizio Lupi, Roberto Formigoni, Beatrice Lorenzin, Fabrizio Cicchitto, Antonio Gentile, Gabriele Albertini, Laura Bianconi, Giovanni La Via and Francesco Colucci) followed Alfano in the new party, while Maurizio Sacconi joined Stefano Parisi's Energies for Italy (EpI).

Since its foundation AP was abandoned by five deputies (four re-joining FI, one joining the PD) and four senators (one joining FI, another the FdI and two the Federation of Freedom, FdL), while two deputies switched from the Liberal Popular Alliance (ALA). One of the deputies who left the party was Enrico Costa, who also resigned as minister of Regional Affairs from Paolo Gentiloni's government and aimed at forming a "liberal centre" with FI.

Road to the 2018 general election

In the run-up of the 2018 general election AP, which was soundly defeated in the 2017 Sicilian regional election, was divided in three camps: those who wanted an alliance with the PD (Lorenzin and Cicchitto), those who proposed to run as a stand-alone list (Lupi) and those who were keen on returning with the centre-right coalition (Formigoni). The decision by the party's national board was postponed several times. In the meantime, Alfano announced that he would not stand in the election.

On 12 December 2017 AP's national board approved a consent settlement, under which the two parliamentary groups would continue to be active in order to prepare the electoral participation of the two main factions: the one led by Lorenzin and Cicchitto (backed by Alfano) with the centre-left (under the "Popular Alternative" name), the one led by Lupi and Formigoni with the centre-right (reviving the "New Centre-Right" banner). A few days later Gentile replaced Lupi as coordinator.

On 19 December the group around Lupi and the former AP members close to Costa formed Us with Italy (NcI), a pro-Berlusconi centrist electoral list within the centre-right coalition, along with Direction Italy (DI), Civic Choice (SC), Act! (F!), Cantiere Popolare (CP) and the Movement for the Autonomies (MpA). The list was later enlarged to the Union of the Centre (UdC) and Identity and Action (IdeA), with the goal of overcoming the 3% threshold under a new electoral law.

On 29 December AP formed the Popular Civic List (CP), a centrist electoral list within the centre-left coalition, along with Italy of Values (IdV), the Centrists for Europe (CpE), Solidary Democracy (DemoS), the Union for Trentino (UpT), Italy is Popular (IP) and minor parties/groups, and Lorenzin was chosen as leader. Contextually, Gentile stepped down from coordinator and announced his return to FI, while continuing to serve as undersecretary in Gentiloni's government.

2018 general election and decline
CP obtained a mere 0.5%, but the rump of AP, led by Lorenzin, had two elects to the Chamber from single-seat constituencies: Lorenzin herself and Gabriele Toccafondi. NcI scored a little better with 1.3% of the vote and a handful of former AP members, notably including Lupi, were elected in single-seat constituencies.

In September 2018 Alfano stepped down from AP presidency and was replaced by Paolo Alli.

In the run-up to the 2019 European Parliament election the party formed a joint list with The People of Family, a social-conservative party. However, the party was deeply fractured, as Lorenzin seemed to be supportive of the PD, while former spokesperson Valentina Castaldini stood as candidate for FI.

In September 2019 Lorenzin joined the PD, while Toccafondi was a founding member of Renzi's Italia Viva party, thus leaving the party with no representatives in Parliament.

Ideology and factions
The party's ideology is that of the NCD, as the former is the perfect continuation of the latter. Despite being home to some social democrats (Reformism and Freedom, We Reformers), the party was mainly a Christian-democratic party with a social-conservative streak. According to Corriere della Sera, differently from FI, NCD's stances on the "so-called ethical issues" (abortion, LGBT rights, etc.) were "closer to those of the European traditionalist right" and "thus not very compatible with those of the EPP's parties in big countries such as (Germany)". However, the party voted in favor of civil unions, whereas most FI members voted against it. The NCD was also criticised by some Catholic associations for not opposing enough the teaching of gender studies in schools. In addition, the NCD, as part of centre-left governments, proved more progressive than FI on the management of illegal immigration, which was negatively evaluated by Berlusconi's party. Precisely for these and other reasons, several NCD politicians left the party to either form Identity and Action (IdeA) led by Gaetano Quagliariello or re-joined FI (e.g. Nunzia De Girolamo, Renato Schifani and Massimiliano Salini), in both cases re-aligning with the FI-led centre-right coalition. Some of the formerly NCD-affiliated factions or think tanks are now affiliated to AP:
Network Italy (Rete Italia) – ideology: Christian democracy; leader: Roberto Formigoni;
Christian Populars (Cristiano Popolari) – ideology: Christian democracy; leader: Mario Baccini;
Christian Reformists (Cristiano Riformisti) – ideology: Christian democracy; leader: Antonio Mazzocchi;
Reformism and Freedom (Riformismo e Libertà) – ideology: Social democracy; leader: Fabrizio Cicchitto;
We Reformers (Noi Riformatori) – ideology: Social democracy; leader: Francesco Colucci.

Electoral results

Italian Parliament

European Parliament

Regional Councils

Leadership
President: Angelino Alfano (2017–2018), Paolo Alli (2018–present)
Coordinator: Maurizio Lupi (2017), Antonio Gentile (2017), Stefano Bandecchi (2022–present)
Spokesperson: Valentina Castaldini (2017–2019)
Party Leader in the Chamber of Deputies: Maurizio Lupi (2017–2018), Beatrice Lorenzin (2018-2019), Gianluca Rospi (2020–2021), Giorgio Silli (2021)
Party Leader in the Senate: Laura Bianconi (2017–2018), Tiiziana Drago (2020–2021)
Party Leader in the European Parliament: Giovanni La Via (2017–2018)

References

Centrist parties in Italy
Christian democratic parties in Italy
Catholic political parties
Political parties established in 2013
2013 establishments in Italy
Member parties of the European People's Party